William Joseph "Barry" McCormick (December 25, 1874January 28, 1956) was a professional baseball player and later a Major League umpire.

As a player, he played infielder in Major League Baseball from 1895 to 1904. He would play for the Louisville Colonels, Chicago Colts/Orphans, St. Louis Browns, and Washington Senators. McCormick was the last player to have eight at-bats in a nine-inning game, achieving this feat on the 29th of June, 1897.

After retiring as a player, he took up umpiring, making his Major League debut in 1917 and winding up his second career in 1929. He was behind the plate for the longest extra inning game in Major League history, the 26-inning contest between the Brooklyn Dodgers and Boston Braves on May 1, 1920.

See also
List of Major League Baseball single-game hits leaders

References

External links

1874 births
1956 deaths
Major League Baseball infielders
Louisville Colonels players
Chicago Colts players
Chicago Orphans players
St. Louis Browns players
Washington Senators (1901–1960) players
19th-century baseball players
Baseball players from Kentucky
New Orleans Pelicans (baseball) players
Indianapolis Hoosiers (minor league) players
Milwaukee Brewers (minor league) managers
Milwaukee Brewers (minor league) players
Minneapolis Millers (baseball) players
St. Paul Saints (AA) players
Mansfield Brownies players
Newark Newks players
Major League Baseball umpires